Hendon is a hamlet in the Rural Municipality of Lakeview No. 337, Saskatchewan, Canada. Listed as a designated place by Statistics Canada, the hamlet had a population of 20 in the Canada 2016 Census.

Demographics 

See also 

 List of communities in Saskatchewan
 Hamlets of Saskatchewan
 Designated place

References

Lakeview No. 337, Saskatchewan
Designated places in Saskatchewan
Organized hamlets in Saskatchewan
Division No. 10, Saskatchewan